The Algerian U21 Cup is an Algerian football competition run by Algerian Football Federation for under-21 sides. The competition was launched in 2011 and is open exclusively to clubs playing in the top two divisions of Algerian football.

JSM Béjaïa won the inaugural edition of the competition by beating ASO Chlef 2–0 in the 2012 final.

Results

Winners table

References

 
2011 establishments in Algeria
Youth football in Algeria
Football cup competitions in Algeria
Recurring sporting events established in 2011